The Golden Hour is a four-part British television medical drama series, written and created by Andrew Rattenbury, first broadcast on 14 September 2005 on ITV. The series, which stars Richard Armitage, Navin Chowdhry, Zoe Telford and Ciarán McMenamin, centres on the activities of a specialist medical unit, the HEMS — or Helicopter Emergency Medical Service — which is based in London and operated by the London Ambulance Service. The title of the series refers to the hour which is deemed the most critical for patients with extensive injuries or severe medical conditions.

Notably, promotional trailers for the series carried the tagline, "You Have One Hour to Live... or Die." The series was one of four commissions, alongside Vincent, Afterlife and All About George, made by then-head of drama at ITV, Nick Elliott, in an attempt to attract a younger demographic. Prior to filming, the lead actors trained with the real HEMS team from the Royal London Hospital in Whitechapel; one of whom, Dr Gareth Davies, was a consultant for the series.

The first episode broadcast to a consolidated audience of 4.98 million viewers. Viewing figures remained between 4 and 5 million for the series run, but despite the consistent ratings, a second series was not commissioned by the network. The innovative structure of the programme was praised by critics, but the quality of the scripts was felt by many to have let the show down. The complete series was released on DVD on 30 July 2007.

Cast
 Richard Armitage as Dr. Alec Track
 Navin Chowdhry as Dr. Naz Osborne
 Ciarán McMenamin as Dr. Paul Keane
 Zoe Telford as Dr. Jane Cameron
 Billy Geraghty as Kurt Jagger
 Pooky Quesnel as Dr. Christine Whelan
 Rebecca Sarker as Nina Osborne
 Francesca Fowler as Lilian Harris
 Chloe Howman as PC Rowena Banks

Episodes

References

External links

2005 British television series debuts
2005 British television series endings
2000s British drama television series
2000s British medical television series
2000s British television miniseries
ITV television dramas
Television series by Fremantle (company)
Television series by Sony Pictures Television
English-language television shows
Television shows set in London